Paul Rosche (1 April 1934 – 15 November 2016) was a German engineer known for his work at BMW. He is notable for designing the engines of a number of BMW's high-performance models, including the M31 found in the BMW 2002 Turbo, the S14 for the E30 M3, the M12 for the 320i Turbo and the Brabham BT52, the M88 in the M1 and the S70/2 found in the V12 LMR and the McLaren F1.

Rosche joined BMW immediately after his graduation, and became very skilled at calculating camshafts. He soon became a specialist in this task, earning the nickname "Nocken-Paul" (Camshaft Paul). He later became a technical director of the BMW M racing program.

Throughout Rosche's career, engines which were designed by him personally or under his stewardship have achieved a total of 150 European Formula Two Championship and Formula One World Championship titles, as well as two victories in the 24 Hours of Le Mans.

Biography 
Paul Rosche joined BMW immediately after his graduation in November 1957, aged 23. The first project Rosche worked on was the camshaft of the BMW 502 and 507. As a result of his high level of skill in calculating camshafts, Rosche quickly began to specialise in this task, earning the nickname "Nocken-Paul" (Camshaft Paul). One of Rosche's first significant projects was the design of the 80 BHP four-cylinder M10 for the 1500. This development later transformed into the 1800TI/SA, with its twin Solex carburettors, generating 130 BHP.

In the mid-1960s, Rosche specialised in motorsports after von Falkenhausen encouraged the management of BMW to use the M10 for motorsports. Rosche designed the 2002TIK, a turbocharged engine that won the 1969 European Touring Car Championship; this was later developed into the 2002 Turbo.

BMW's racing programme was halted in 1970 by its sales and marketing director, Paul G. Hahnemann, after his position came under threat from the company's board. Some believed that this was a result of Gerhard Mitter's fatal accident at the Nürburgring in the previous year, as well as budget cuts. Rosche and von Falkenhausen led the development group discreetly until BMW was encouraged to make a comeback in the world of racing in 1972. Shortly afterwards, they collaborated with the Formula Two project organised by March Engineering's factory team. Here, Rosche played a very significant role, leading to a string of successes in the European Championship as well as in touring car racing. In 1973, Rosche became the head of the main advanced development and racing engine development division.

After Von Falkenhausen's retirement in 1975, Rosche became the technical head of BMW Motorsport, overseeing the development and production of racing engines for the M1.  Later, he became technical director, a post which he held from 1979 until 1996.

With the help of Jochen Neerpasch, Rosche tried to encourage BMW to enter Formula One using the M12 turbocharged engine, which was based on the M10 engine. When this bid failed, Neerpasch resigned and was replaced by Dieter Stappert, who persuaded the board to attempt the project again in 1980. The engine was tested at the end of the year and made its debut in 1982, winning its first race soon after with Nelson Piquet at the Canadian Grand Prix. This engine went on to achieve another eight wins in F1, as well as leading Piquet to his second World Championship title in 1983. The BMW engine later produced the biggest power output in F1 history (a peak speculated at 1500 bhp and confirmed at 1300bhp).

BMW withdrew from F1 at the end of 1986 and sold their engines to Megatron. Rosche built prototype engines thereafter, but the company refused to return to F1. Around the same time, Rosche also developed the S14 for the E30 M3, which became the most successful car in Group A racing.

Gordon Murray, who had previously worked with Rosche during their time at Brabham in the early 1980s, met Rosche after the 1990 German Grand Prix. When his plans to develop an engine with Honda fell through, Murray turned to BMW Motorsport for their services. This led to Rosche being tasked with the development of an engine for the McLaren F1. The goal originally demanded by Murray was a 4.5-litre V10 or V12 producing 550 bhp, with a maximum 600mm block length and 250 kg, including all the ancillaries, the exhaust and silencer. The development of this engine started with a completely new design, taking a few components from the M70; the eventual result was the S70/2. This engine exceeded its goal at 627 bhp; however, it exceeded the maximum weight by 16 kg. In the version used for racing, the F1 GTR, this engine won the 1995 24 Hours of Le Mans; later, it also won this title in 1999 with the V12 LMR.

Rosche's final project before retiring at the age of 65 was the E41 for the Williams FW22. Werner Laurenz took over the position of technical director at BMW Motorsport after Rosche's retirement. Even though he had retired, Rosche was one of the team of 30 mechanics who helped to restore the Brabham BT52 that had won the 1983 Formula One season in preparation for the Goodwood Festival of Speed in 2013.

Rosche died on 15 November 2016.

References 

1934 births
2016 deaths
BMW people
Engineers from Munich
Formula One engineers
German automotive engineers
German motorsport people